The 2011 Pac-12 Football Championship Game was played on Friday, December 2, 2011 at Autzen Stadium in Eugene, Oregon to determine the 2011 football champion of the Pac-12 Conference. The game featured the UCLA Bruins of the South Division against the Oregon Ducks of the North Division. It was the first football conference championship for the Pac-12 Conference, or any of its predecessors. The Ducks defeated the Bruins 49–31, and would earn a berth in the 2012 Rose Bowl. At the Rose Bowl Game, the Ducks defeated the Wisconsin Badgers 45–38 for the Rose Bowl Championship trophy.

UCLA was named South Division Champions and earned a berth in the game even though it only had the second best record in the South Division; while the South Division's best record belonged to USC, the Trojans were ineligible to participate in the game due to NCAA sanctions. Both Oregon and Stanford finished with identical 8–1 conference records in the North Division; however Oregon defeated Stanford during the season, giving them the berth in the championship game.

The three-hour-27-minute game started at 5:20 p.m. PST/6:20 p.m. MST and televised by Fox Sports.  Oregon running back LaMichael James was the game MVP.

Pregame buildup 
 On November 28, 2011, UCLA Coach Rick Neuheisel was fired, but he was allowed to coach in the Championship game.

Game summary

First quarter
UCLA received the ball to start the game, but running back Johnathan Franklin fumbled on the game's second play to allow Oregon to score first on a 30-yard by LaMichael James.  UCLA then forced a fumble on a reception by Oregon running back De'Anthony Thomas, but were unable to capitalize on it.  However, quarterback Darron Thomas then threw an interception which was returned by linebacker Patrick Larimore for a 35-yard score.  The Ducks came right back to score on a 10-yard run by Darron Thomas and took advantage of Franklin's second fumble late in the quarter to score on a 7-yard reception by tight end Colt Lyerla.

Second quarter
The Bruins opened the second quarter with a 37-yard strike from Kevin Prince to receiver Nelson Rosario for their second touchdown of the game.  The Ducks however added to their lead with a 3-yard touchdown run by James and a 25-yard reception by receiver Daryle Hawkins, which was set up by a fumble UCLA running back Derrick Coleman.  With 11 seconds left in the half UCLA was able to drive downfield and make a 44-yard field goal to trail Oregon 35-17.

Third quarter
The first points of the second half were scored by Prince with a 1-yard run.  However, the Ducks continued to pull away, scoring on a 5-yard run by James and a 22-yard touchdown reception by tight end David Paulson on back to back possessions.

Fourth quarter
Prince was briefly knocked out of the game during the second series of the quarter and was replaced by Richard Brehaut.  However Brehaut then threw an interception for the Bruins' fourth turnover of the game.  Prince returned to lead the Bruins on the longest scoring drive of the game, which culminated in a 19-yard touchdown reception to Rosario for the game's final score.

Scoring summary

Game notes
Oregon set several marks during the game:

Running back LaMichael James became the first player in conference history to rush for 1,500 or more yards three times in a career.  He tied LenDale White with second-most career rushing touchdowns in conference history at 52.
Quarterback Darron Thomas set a school record for career touchdown passes with 63.  He also became the first player in program history to throw for 30 touchdowns in two seasons.
The game marked the 82nd consecutive sellout for an Oregon football game at Autzen Stadium, going back to 1999.

See also
 List of Pac-12 Conference football champions

References

Championship
2011
Oregon Ducks football games
UCLA Bruins football games
Sports in Eugene, Oregon
2011 in sports in Oregon
December 2011 sports events in the United States